Dominic Edward Murphy (b Balrothery 1651 - d Dublin 1728) was  an Irish Roman Catholic bishop in the first third of the 18th century.

Murphy trained in the Irish College at Salamanca and was ordained a priest in Madrid, in 1677. He was consecrated Bishop of Kildare and Leighlin in 1715 and translated to the
Archbishopric of Dublin in 1724. He died in post on 22 December 1728.

Notes

1651 births
1728 deaths
People from County Dublin
18th-century Roman Catholic archbishops in Ireland
Roman Catholic archbishops of Dublin
Roman Catholic bishops of Kildare and Leighlin